Professor Jennifer Louise "Jenny" Martin  is an Australian scientist, academic, and was recently the Deputy Vice-Chancellor (Research and Innovation) at the University of Wollongong, in New South Wales. She is a former Director of the Griffith Institute for Drug Discovery at Griffith University. and a former Australian Research Council Laureate Fellow at the Institute for Molecular Bioscience, University of Queensland. Her research expertise lies in the areas of structural biology, protein crystallography, protein interactions and their applications in drug design and discovery.

Education
Martin completed a Bachelor of Pharmacy at the Victorian College of Pharmacy in Melbourne from 1979–1981, receiving the Gold Medal for the best student in the B Pharm course. After spending a year as a trainee pharmacist, she completed a Masters in Pharmacy, supervised by Professor Peter Andrews, on the application of computational chemistry to opioid analgesics, which piqued her interest in research and led to her first scientific publications. She then left Australia to undertake a DPhil at the University of Oxford supported by a Royal Commission for the Exhibition of 1851 Science Research Scholarship and four other scholarships and bursaries. Under the guidance of Professors Peter Goodford and Louise Johnson, her PhD research used protein crystallography to design glycogen phosphorylase inhibitors as potential anti-diabetic compounds. Martin paid tribute to the positive influence that Louise Johnson had on her career upon her death in 2012. In 2015, Martin completed the London Business School four-week Senior Executive Programme as part of a cohort of 50 industry, government, not-for-profit and academic leaders from around the world.

Scientific career

After completing her PhD she returned briefly to Australia to take up a post-doctoral position at Bond University in 1990. However, the unexpected closure of the School of Science and Technology resulted in her leaving Australia early in 1991 to take up a post-doctoral position with Professor John Kuriyan, a structural biologist, at Rockefeller University in New York to work on the disulfide bond forming family of proteins (DSBs) in Escherichia coli. She solved the structure of the DsbA protein which was published in 1993 in the high impact journal Nature.

In 1993 Martin received an ARC Queen Elizabeth II Fellowship. This enabled her to return to Australia and establish the first protein crystallography lab in Queensland, which is now known as the UQ Remote Operation Crystallisation and X-ray Diffraction (UQ ROCX) Facility, of which Martin is the Foundation Director. She remained at the University of Queensland until 2015, supported by several other fellowships: an Australian Research Council (ARC) Senior Research Fellowship in 1999, and a National Health and Medical Research Council (NHMRC) Senior Research Fellowship in 2007. In 2009, Martin was one of just 15 researchers, and only two women, to receive an inaugural ARC Australian Laureate Fellowship. In 2016, Martin was appointed Director of the Eskitis Drug Discovery Institute at Griffith University, which hosts unique drug discovery resources including Compounds Australia and NatureBank

Since returning to Australia and establishing her own research group, Martin has continued working on DSB proteins and with collaborators is now developing inhibitors of these bacterial proteins as a potential means of combatting antibiotic resistance. She also began working on other proteins including phenylethanolamine N-methyl transferase (PNMT), an enzyme that catalyses adrenaline synthesis. Martin published the structure of this enzyme and later, as part of her ongoing research into different PNMT substrate-bound complexes, she and her team became the first remote access user of the Australian Synchrotron. Over the past 10 years, she and her team have also contributed significantly to the structural biology of membrane fusion, a fundamentally important process that underpins systems as diverse as neurotransmission and blood glucose control. She wrote an invited commentary for The Conversation in 2013 on this topic, and was invited to present a keynote lecture on her membrane fusion research at the 23rd triennial International Union of Crystallography Congress held in Montreal in 2014. In March 2019 Martin joined the University of Wollongong as Deputy Vice-Chancellor (Research and Innovation).. She stepped down from the role in June 2022.

Honours and leadership roles
In addition to the research fellowships she has been awarded during her career, Martin has also received several honours in recognition of her professional contributions including:
2005 Roche Medal, Australian Society for Biochemistry and Molecular Biology
2005 Queensland Government Smart Women Smart State Award (Research Scientist Category)
2006 Women in Biotech Outstanding Biotechnology Researcher Award
2007 Dorothy Hodgkin Memorial Lecture, Oxford
2007 Honorary Life Membership, Questacon (National Science and Technology Centre), Canberra
2010 Lady Masson Lecture, The University of Melbourne
2011 Women in Technology Outstanding Biotechnology Achievement
2015 Finalist, Newscorp QLD Pride of Australia Inspiration Category
2015 Finalist, NAB Women's Agenda, Mentor of the Year
2016, Finalist, Queensland Telstra Business Women of the Year, Public Sector and Academia
2017, Wunderly Oration and Medal, Thoracic Society of Australia and New Zealand
2017, Elected Fellow of the Australian Academy of Science
2017, Elected Eminent Fellow of the Royal Australian Chemical Institute 
2017, Inducted Bragg Member, Royal Institution of Australia
2018 Made a Companion of the Order of Australia for "eminent service to science, and to scientific research, particularly in the field of biochemistry and protein crystallography applied to drug-resistant bacteria, as a role model, and as an advocate for gender equality in science".
2019  Appointed to the University of Wollongong as Deputy Vice-Chancellor (Research and Innovation).
2020 Leach Lecturer, Lorne Protein Conference

Martin has also held a number of leadership roles on national and international committees. She is a former chair of the National Committee for Crystallography of the Australian Academy of Science (2008–2011), a past President of the Society for Crystallographers in Australia and New Zealand (2003–2005) and a former member of the Scientific Advisory Committee of the Australian Synchrotron (2002–2009, 2015), the President of the Asian Crystallography Association (2016–2019) and a member of the Executive Committee of the International Union of Crystallography (2017–).

Advocacy and science communication
In more recent years Martin has emerged as a strong advocate for equal opportunity and addressing gender imbalance in academia. She published a letter in the prestigious journal Nature calling for scientific conference organisers to be more transparent with respect to their gender-balance policies and historical data. This inspired Dr Kat Holt to develop a website, "Look Who's Talking", that presents crowdsourced data on gender balance at scientific conferences held in Australia. Martin also writes a blog  which focuses on issues relating to women in academia, and she was a Foundation member of the steering committee for Science in Australia Gender Equity (SAGE) which recently launched a pilot of the UK Athena SWAN charter to address the under-representation of women in science, particularly at senior positions in universities. As an opinion leader she has been invited to speak on gender equity worldwide, and across sectors. In 2017, she presented a keynote lecture on addressing conference gender equity at the  Australia and New Zealand College of Anaesthetists Annual Scientific Meeting, and presented the Wunderly oration at the Thoracic Society Australia and New Zealand and Society of Respiratory Science Annual Scientific Meeting. In 2018 she gave the invited Inaugural Ruth Gall Memorial Lecture for the School of Chemistry at the University of Sydney on International Women's Day and the Chuwen Keynote Address at the 5th national meeting of the Australian Academy of Science EMCR Forum Science Pathways "Diversify your Thinking".

Martin also contributes to science communication initiatives to help a wider audience understand her scientific fields of interest. She has participated in events such as BrisScience, which runs public lectures on science and technology; SCOM BOMB, a Google hangout operated by the Australian Science Communicators, Science Rewired and the Centre for the Public Awareness of Science as part of the No Funny Business science communication website; and the 2014 UNESCO International Year of Crystallography, including a radio interview and public lecture. She also writes articles for The Conversation, an independent, online source of news and views from the academic and research community.

Personal life
Martin grew up in a large family of nine children in Dandenong, Victoria. She currently resides in Wollongong with her husband Michael.

References

External links
 Professor Jennifer Martin's Griffith Experts profile
 cubistcrystal: Jenny Martin's blog

Australian women scientists
People from Brisbane
Alumni of the University of Oxford
Academic staff of the University of Queensland
Monash University alumni
Living people
Year of birth missing (living people)
Place of birth missing (living people)
Scientists from Melbourne
Computational chemists
Companions of the Order of Australia
Fellows of the Australian Academy of Science
People from Dandenong, Victoria
Academic staff of Griffith University
Academic staff of the University of Wollongong